Massad, also spelled Masad, Massaad, Mas'ad or Masaad, may refer to:

Surnames
 Massad family, Palestinian, Lebanese-American family

People
 Anthony Massad (1928–2017), American politician
 Ernest Massad (1908–1993), U.S. Army Major General
 Joseph Massad (b. 1963), professor of Middle Eastern studies
 Massad (b. 1993), New Zealand-born musician
 Massad Ayoob (b. 1948), firearms and self-defence instructor
 Masaad Kassis (1918–1989), Israeli-Arab politician
 Indra Massad (b. 1976), drummer for the Indonesian band Mocca
 Mohammad Massad (b. 1983), Saudi Arabian football (soccer) player
 Paul Peter Massad (b. 1806), Lebanese Maronite Christian Patriarch of Antioch
 Salah Massad (b. 1989), Jordanian football (soccer) player  
 Timothy Massad (b. 1956), American lawyer and government official

Companies
 Bank Massad, Israeli bank

Places
 Camp Massad (Manitoba), a summer camp in Winnipeg Beach, Manitoba
 Camp Massad (Montreal), a summer camp in Ste. Agathe, Quebec, based in Montreal
 Camp Massad (Poconos), a summer camp in Poconos, Pennsylvania, which closed down in 1981
 Masad or Massad, a community settlement in northern Israel